Sergio Tomás Massa (born 28 April 1972) is an Argentine politician currently serving as the country's Minister of Economy since 3 August 2022. From 2019 to 2022, he served as President of the Chamber of Deputies, while serving as a National Deputy for the Frente de Todos elected in Buenos Aires Province. A former member of the Justicialist Party, in 2013 he founded his own political party, the Renewal Front.

Massa previously served as Chief of the Cabinet of Ministers from 2008 to 2009 under Cristina Fernández de Kirchner. He also served twice as intendente (mayor) of Tigre, and as Executive Director of ANSES, Argentina's decentralized state social insurance agency. As the leader of United for a New Alternative, Massa ran for President in 2015, finishing third in the first round of voting with 21%.

On 28 July 2022, Massa was designated as Minister of Economy by President Alberto Fernández. He took office on 3 August 2022.

Early life
Massa was born in western Buenos Aires suburb of San Martín in 1972, to Italian parents from Niscemi, Sicily, and raised in neighboring San Andrés. Attending the School of St. Augustine through grade and secondary school, he enrolled at the University of Belgrano, a private university in the upscale Buenos Aires borough of the same name. Leaving school before completing his law degree studies, he married Malena Galmarini, whose father, Fernando Galmarini, was at the time Secretary of Sports for President Carlos Menem. He did not finish his law degree studies until 2013, during the campaign of 2013 legislative election.

Political career

Early career
He became affiliated to the conservative UCeDé in 1989 as an aide to Alejandro Keck, councilman for the San Martín partido (which includes San Andrés). Massa joined the ruling Justicialist Party in 1995, when the UCeDé endorsed the re-election of President Menem after the latter had sidestepped much of his populist Justicialist Party's platform in favor of a more conservative one. In 1999, he was elected to the Buenos Aires Province Chamber of Deputies as part of the Justicialist Party list. Shortly after a crisis led to President Fernando de la Rúa's December 2001 resignation, the Congress appointed Senator Eduardo Duhalde, a more traditional Peronist than Menem had been. Acquainted with Massa through Restaurant Workers' Union leader Luis Barrionuevo. Duhalde appointed Massa as Director of the ANSeS (Argentina's Social Security administration).

The pragmatic Massa ran on President Néstor Kirchner's center-left Front for Victory ticket during the 2005 legislative elections.  Securing a seat in the Chamber of Deputies (lower house of Congress), he forfeited it at the behest of the President, who requested that he stay on as Director of ANSeS. Remaining at the post two more years, he oversaw the voluntary conversion of several million private pension accounts to the ANSeS' aegis when this choice was made available in December 2006.

Mayor of Tigre and Cabinet Chief

Massa was elected Mayor of the Paraná Delta partido of Tigre in October 2007. That year's elections also brought President Néstor Kirchner's wife, Senator Cristina Kirchner, to the Presidency.  Enjoying large majorities in Congress, her administration suffered its first major setback when her proposals for higher agricultural export taxes were defeated on July 16, 2008, with Vice President Julio Cobos's surprise, tie-breaking vote against them.  The controversy helped lead to the July 23 resignation of Alberto Fernández, the president's Cabinet Chief, and to his replacement with Sergio Massa who, at 36, became the youngest person to hold the influential post since its creation in 1994.

He was persuaded to run as a stand-in candidate (who, after the election, would cede his new seat to a down-ticket name on the party list) for the ruling Front for Victory (FpV) ahead of the June 2009 mid-term elections. Massa, however, enlisted his own candidates (including his wife) for the Tigre City Council under his own ticket, and its success in these city council races distanced him from others in the FpV. Massa had, moreover, harbored differences with the president over a number of policies, including the nationalization of loss-producing private pension funds, the use of the INDEC bureau to understate inflation data, and the vast regulatory powers granted to Commerce Secretary Guillermo Moreno. Following the FpV's narrow defeat in the Chamber of Deputies mid-term races, Massa tendered his resignation to the President, effective July 7. Massa, who appointed the city council president as provisional mayor while he served as the president's cabinet chief, returned to his office of Mayor of Tigre on July 24. He was investigated along with other officials for the illegal retention of "repayments" of nonexistent loans from the pensions of about 17 thousand retired while he was director of the ANSES

Break with the Kirchners
In 2010, Massa joined a group of eight Buenos Aires Province mayors in calling for the establishment of local police departments independent of the Provincial Police; this 'Group of 8' had become disaffected to varying degrees with the Kirchner government, and came to view Massa as presidential timber for a future date. He stumbled into controversy, however, when the WikiLeaks disclosures of 2010 mentioned a number of indiscretions on Massa's part during a dinner hosted the previous year at the U.S. Ambassador's Residence. He was said by one of Ambassador Vilma Socorro Martínez's cables to have revealed details about working with former President Néstor Kirchner, stating that he was "a psychopath; a monster whose bully approach to politics shows his sense of inferiority." He reportedly added that the former president "runs the Argentine government" while his wife (the President) "followed orders," and that she "would be better off without him." He nevertheless remained allied as a member of the FpV faction and the Cristina Kirchner administration, and was re-elected mayor on the FpV slate with 73% of the vote in 2011.

Polling ahead of the October 2013 mid-term elections gave Massa better prospects running for Congress under the FpV party list than on a separate slate. Upon the filing deadline on June 22, however, Massa ultimately opted to form his own Frente Renovador ('Renewal Front') faction with the support of the 'Group of 8' Buenos Aires Province Mayors and others, notably former Argentine Industrial Union president José Ignacio de Mendiguren (recently an ally of Kirchner). This split with Kirchner proved successful for Massa as the Renewal Front slate beat the FpV slate in the Buenos Aires province in both the primary and general elections.

In October 2013, Javier Corradino, president of the Commercial Chamber of Tigre, Adrian Zolezzi, secretary of the same entity, and Santiago Maneiro, secretary of the Commercial Chamber of Pacheco, reported that four of their shops had been closed by Sergio Massa in retaliation for having made a trade agreement with the National Social Security Administration to operate the Argenta card, administered by ANSeS. They denounced the closures as anti-democratic and an act of political persecution towards traders in the municipality. Javier Corradino was expelled from a campaign of Renewal Front's Malena Galmarini, Tigre City Council secretary for health policy and human development, and wife of Sergio Massa.

2015 and 2017 campaigns

Ahead of the 2015 general election, Massa announced his intention to run for President of Argentina. He joined forces with Córdoba governor José Manuel de la Sota to form the United for a New Alternative alliance. Massa sought to appeal to centrist voters in an election disputed by the Peronist Daniel Scioli and the centre-right conservative Mauricio Macri, and focused his campaign on the fight against corruption, climate change, and development through renewable energy sources. In the first round of voting, on 25 October 2015, Massa was the third-most voted candidate with 21% of the vote, trailing behind Scioli and Macri, who went on to dispute the presidency in the second round.

In the 2017 legislative election, Massa's Renewal Front joined forces with progressives Margarita Stolbizer and Victoria Donda to form the 1País ("1Country") electoral coalition. Facing the end of his term as national deputy, Massa and Stolbizer ran for Buenos Aires Province's seats in the National Senate. The senatorial bid was, however, unsuccessful, as the 1País list landed third in the election behind Cambiemos and Unidad Ciudadana.

Frente de Todos and presidency of the Chamber

Ahead of the 2019 general election, Massa made public his intention to once again run for President and launched "Alternativa Federal", a coalition with other non-Kirchnerist members of the Justicialist Party such as Miguel Ángel Pichetto and Juan Manuel Urtubey. However, following the announcement of Cristina Fernández de Kirchner that she would not run for President, but would instead back Alberto Fernández, Massa stood down from the race and pledged his support for the newly formed Frente de Todos, a coalition of Peronist parties and alliances, both Kirchnerist and non-Kirchnerist. He was then nominated to run for a seat in the National Chamber of Deputies as the first candidate in the Frente de Todos list in Buenos Aires Province.

The Frente de Todos list won in a landslide in Buenos Aires Province, easily securing Massa's seat in the Chamber. Upon taking office on 4 December 2019, he was elected as president of the Chamber, succeeding Emilio Monzó. As president of the Chamber of Deputies, Massa introduced modifications to the chamber statute to guarantee gender parity in parliamentary commissions, and splitting the commission on Family, Women, Children and Adolescence into two separate commissions for Family and Childhood and Women and Diversity. During the COVID-19 pandemic and subsequent lockdown in Argentina, Massa's administration sought to lower the costs of parliamentary proceedings by suspending legislative aides and restricting mobility benefits for deputies.

In December 2021, Massa was ratified as president of the Chamber for another two years by all parliamentary blocs in the Chamber.

One of Massa's flagship issues during his tenure as president of the Chamber was the reduction of tax pressures on the middle class. In 2022, Renewal Front deputies introduced legislation to raise the minimum quota for income tax.

Minister of Economy
On 29 July 2022, Massa was designated as the country's new Minister of Economy, taking over three previously stand-alone ministries of Economy, Productive Development and Agriculture in the cabinet of President Alberto Fernández. Massa's designation came less than a month after Silvina Batakis' appointment, following the resignation of Martín Guzmán. The fusion of the three ministries led the media to dub Massa superministro ("super-minister"), a term that had previously been used to describe economy ministers in other governments such as Nicolás Dujovne and Domingo Cavallo.

Initial market speculations regarding Massa's first measures as minister led to the Argentine peso recovering against the US dollar, with the unofficial exchange rate ("dólar blue") descending to $280 ARS per dollar on 1 August 2022, down from the peak of $338 ARS per dollar on 21 July.

Personal life
Massa is married to Malena Galmarini, a fellow politician and member of a Peronist political family. Galmarini and Massa met in 1996, and married in 2001. The couple have two children, Milagros and Tomás. Through Galmarini's father, Fernando Galmarini, Massa is the son in law of TV presenter and vedette Moria Casán.

Sports-wise, Massa is a supporter of Club Atlético Tigre.

Electoral history

Executive

Legislative

References

External links

|-

|-

|-

1972 births
Argentine people of Italian descent
Argentine people of Sicilian descent
Argentine Ministers of Finance
Candidates for President of Argentina
Chiefs of Cabinet of Ministers of Argentina
Justicialist Party politicians
Living people
Mayors of places in Argentina
Members of the Argentine Chamber of Deputies elected in Buenos Aires Province
Members of the Buenos Aires Province Chamber of Deputies
People from San Martín, Buenos Aires
People from Tigre, Buenos Aires
Presidents of the Argentine Chamber of Deputies
Renewal Front politicians